Phausis inaccensa, also known as the "shadow ghost", is a species of firefly in the family of beetles known as Lampyridae. It is found in North America. The larviform females of the species are bioluminescent, whereas the males are winged but lanternless.

References

Further reading

 
 

Lampyridae
Bioluminescent insects
Articles created by Qbugbot
Beetles described in 1878